Ginger is an English given name, nickname, and surname.

People with the given name 
 Ginger Costa-Jackson (born 1986), American opera singer
 Ginger Gilmour (born 1949), American artist, former wife of Pink Floyd guitarist David Gilmour, born Virginia Hasenbein
 Ginger Helgeson-Nielsen (born 1968), American tennis player
 Ginger Huber, American diver, high diving silver medalist in the 2013 World Aquatics Championships
 Ginger Lynn (born 1962), American pornographic actress
 Ginger Molloy (born 1937), former Grand Prix motorcycle road racer from New Zealand
 Ginger Riley Munduwalawala (c. 1937–2002), Australian Aboriginal artist
 Ginger Pooley (born 1977), rock musician and singer formerly with The Smashing Pumpkins
 Ginger Stanley (born 1931), American model, actress and stunt woman
 Ginger Strand, 21st century American essayist, novelist, environmental writer, and historian
 Ginger Brooks Takahashi (born 1977), American artist
 Ginger Williams (singer) (born 1953), Jamaican-born British lovers rock singer

People with the nickname 
 Ginger Baker (1939–2019), English drummer, founder of the rock band Cream
 Albert "Ginger" Baker (born c. 1951), Northern Irish former loyalist and ex-British Army soldier convicted of four murders
 Ginger Beaumont (1876–1956), Major League Baseball player
 William Boyle, 12th Earl of Cork (1873–1967), Royal Navy Admiral of the Fleet
 Ginger Colton (1875–c. 1946), Australian rugby union player
 Albert Goodwin (1887–1918), Canadian labour leader and union activist
 Geri "Ginger Spice" Halliwell (born 1972), British singer-songwriter and former member of the Spice Girls
 Ginger Johnson (1916–1975), Nigerian percussionist and bandleader in London
 Ginger Jones (1905–1986), Welsh boxer
 James Harry Lacey (1917–1989), Royal Air Force fighter ace
 Ginger Lees (1905–?), British motorcycle speedway rider
 Ginger McCain (1930–2011), English National Hunt horse trainer
 Ginger Minj (born 1984), American drag queen and contestant on the RuPaul's Drag Race series.
 JJ "Ginger" O'Connell (1887–1944), member of the Irish Republican Army, general (later demoted to colonel) in the Irish Defence Forces
 W. G. Richardson (1909–1959), English footballer
 Ginger Rogers (1911–1995), American actress, dancer, and singer.
 Ginger Shinault (1892–1930), American Major League Baseball player
 Ginger Smock (1920–1995), American violinist, orchestra leader and local Los Angeles television personality
 James Williams (Welsh footballer) (c. 1886–1916), Welsh footballer

People with the surname 
 Ann Fagan Ginger (born 1925), American lawyer, teacher, writer, and political activist
 George Ginger (1863–1938), British philatelist (stamp collector)
 Phyllis Ginger (1907–2005), British artist
 Ray Ginger (1924–1975), American historian, author, and biographer, husband of Ann Fagan Ginger
 Sergei Ginger (1870–1937), Moldovan architect

Fictional characters with the given name
 Ginger Foutley, in the television series As Told by Ginger
 Ginger Fox, in the television sitcom iCarly
 Ginger Grant, in the television series Gilligan's Island
 Ginger Hebblethwaite, a main character in the Biggles series of books by W. E. Johns
 Ginger Meggs, in the Australian comic of the same name
 Talking Ginger, a main character in the Talking Tom and Friends media franchise
 Ginger (comics), in The Beezer
 Ginger, a sorrel mare in Anna Sewell's Black Beauty
 Ginger, the main character in Chicken Run
 Ginger, a character in the Disney Fairies books
 Ginger, a character on Phineas and Ferb
 Ginger, a character on The Simpsons
 Ginger, a character on The West Wing

See also 
 Ginger (disambiguation)

English-language surnames
Lists of people by nickname